Come the Fire, Come the Evening is a live album by British rock band The Amazons, released on 29 June 2018 by Fiction Records.

Background 
The live extended play was recorded over the series of two shows played in the United Kingdom. The first set was recorded during their live show at The Hexagon in Reading, while their second set of songs were recorded during their concert at The Forum in London. The show at The Hexagon was on 10 February 2018, and the show at The Forum was on 22 February 2018.

Track listing

References

External links 
 

2018 live albums
The Amazons (band) albums
Fiction Records live albums
Universal Music Group live albums